The Swan 44 was designed by Olin Stephens and built by Nautor's Swan and first launched in 1972.

External links
 Swan website

References

Sailing yachts
Keelboats
Sailboat types built by Nautor Swan
Sailboat type designs by Sparkman and Stephens
Sailboat type designs by Olin Stephens